Maria Eutokia Toaputeitou (died 27 August 1869) was Queen consort of the island of Mangareva, and other Gambier Islands including Akamaru, Aukena, Taravai and Temoe. She served as regent for her son in his minority and for a short period afterward in the interregnum period when the royal succession of Mangareva was in doubt.

Biography 
Maria Eutokia was the second wife of King Gregorio I Maputeoa. Christianity was introduced to the Gambier Islands in her lifetime by French Picpus priests, Honoré Laval and François Caret with the support of her husband Maputeoa and his uncle Matua, the high priest. She was baptized with the name Maria Eutokia after her conversion to the new faith.
Maria Eutokia and Maputeoa had five children, two sons and three daughters, which survived infancy. The royal couple's five children include the eldest surviving son Joseph Gregorio II, a second son named Jean Népomucène after Saint John of Nepomuk, and three daughters: Agnès Tepairu, Philomèle, and Catherine, two of these girls became nuns in the Rouru Convent on Mount Duff.

In 1857, Maputeoa died and Joseph Gregorio became king at the age of ten. Because of his minority, Queen Maria Eutokia assumed the regency for the young monarch. Considered a sickly child, Joseph Gregorio died on 21 November 1868 without leaving issue. Because the throne of Mangareva could only pass to a male heir, another regency was installed with Maria Eutokia at the head pending the birth of a male heir from one of Maputeoa and Maria Eutokia's two surviving daughters. At the time, other factions in the kingdom were in support of ending the monarchy and either becoming a Republic or a theocracy under the guidance of Father Honoré Laval and the French mission. Queen Maria Eutokia relied on the advice and counsel of Father Laval just as over a decade earlier, Queen Pōmare IV of Tahiti looked to British consul and missionary George Pritchard.

After serving as Queen Regent for another year, Maria Eutokia retired and entered the Rouru Convent on Mount Duff becoming a novice in her later life. Akakio Tematereikura, a cousin of Maputeoa's and son of his uncle Matua, succeeded as regent. However, because Akakio predeceased Maria Eutokia by three days, she was responsible for choosing the next regent for Mangareva. She considered choosing Father Laval as the new regent and turu (guardian) of her two surviving daughter Agnès and Philomèle but Laval refused the offer. Instead, Aarona, a paternal uncle of her children, was chosen to succeed as regent and another chief Bernardo Putairi became the guardian and tutor of the two girls. Maria Eutokia died shortly afterward on 27 August 1869. Her eldest daughter Agnès died on November 1873 and Philomèle, considered an idiot, blind and a hunchback, died before 1881.
After the demise of most of the royal family (togoʻiti), the Gambier Islands steadily fell under colonial influence, becoming a French protectorate in 1871 and fully annexed to the territory of French Oceania in 1881, today part of the overseas country of French Polynesia.

References

Bibliography 

|-

History of French Polynesia
Gambier Islands
Year of birth unknown
1869 deaths
French Polynesian royalty
Female regents
People from the Gambier Islands
19th-century women rulers